Booker is a town in Lipscomb and Ochiltree counties in the U.S. state of Texas. It was named for B.F. Booker, a civil engineer for the Panhandle and Santa Fe Railway. The population was 1,516 at the 2010 census.

Geography
It is incorporated in Lipscomb County, and most of its territory lies in the northwest corner of that county; only a small portion extends west into Ochiltree County.

According to the United States Census Bureau, the town has a total area of 1.0 square miles (2.7 km2), all of it land.

History
Booker was founded seven miles north of where it currently sits as La Kemp, Oklahoma, in 1909.  However, ten years later when the Panhandle and Santa Fe Railway was built from Shattuck, Oklahoma, to Spearman, Texas, the entire town moved seven miles across the state line to be near the railroad.  The town was platted shortly before the move in 1917 by Thomas C. Spearman who had Spearman, Texas named after him.  La Kemp was renamed Booker in honor of one of the engineers for the railroad. The railroad was removed c. 2006–2007.

Demographics

2020 census

As of the 2020 United States census, there were 1,437 people, 496 households, and 389 families residing in the town.

2000 census
As of the census of 2000, there were 1,315 people, 455 households, and 342 families residing in the town. The population density was 1,260.3 people per square mile (488.2/km2). There were 541 housing units at an average density of 518.5 per square mile (200.8/km2). The racial makeup of the town was 71.48% White, 0.46% African American, 0.76% Native American, 0.15% Asian, 24.56% from other races, and 2.59% from two or more races. Hispanic or Latino of any race were 38.71% of the population.

There were 455 households, out of which 43.3% had children under the age of 18 living with them, 63.7% were married couples living together, 8.4% had a female householder with no husband present, and 24.8% were non-families. 23.1% of all households were made up of individuals, and 11.0% had someone living alone who was 65 years of age or older. The average household size was 2.79 and the average family size was 3.29.

In the town, the population was spread out, with 31.6% under the age of 18, 8.2% from 18 to 24, 28.8% from 25 to 44, 16.8% from 45 to 64, and 14.5% who were 65 years of age or older. The median age was 33 years. For every 100 females, there were 94.2 males. For every 100 females age 18 and over, there were 90.5 males.

The median income for a household in the town was $31,696, and the median income for a family was $39,904. Males had a median income of $28,125 versus $20,677 for females. The per capita income for the town was $13,620. About 15.8% of families and 20.5% of the population were below the poverty line, including 27.4% of those under age 18 and 8.3% of those age 65 or over.

Streets
The town has billboards on the western and eastern edges of town along Texas State Highway 15 that read "Booker: Next 9 Exits" which is a reference to all the streets that run north-south that meet the highway as it passes through town.

The streets of the town are arranged in a regular manner alphabetically and categorically in the "south of the railroad tracks" side of town. The north–south streets west of Main Street are named after flowers and trees. Streets on the east side are names of Texas cities and historical figures with the exception of one street.

Education
The town is served by the Booker Independent School District.

Notable people

 Brent Guy, former head football coach at Utah State University and former defensive coordinator for the University of Tulsa

Climate
According to the Köppen Climate Classification system, Booker has a semi-arid climate, abbreviated "BSk" on climate maps.

References

External links
 

Towns in Lipscomb County, Texas
Towns in Ochiltree County, Texas
Towns in Texas